Lukáš Džogan (pronounced Djogan) (born 1 January 1987) is a professional Slovak football defender who currently plays for FK TATRA Sokoľany.

Career statistics

Last updated: 21 May 2010

External links
 Player profile at official club website
http://www.goal.com/en-ng/people/slovakia/33823/lukas-dzogan

1987 births
Living people
Sportspeople from Košice
Association football central defenders
Slovak footballers
FC Steel Trans Ličartovce players
FC Lokomotíva Košice players
FC VSS Košice players
Slovak Super Liga players